Susan Lyon may refer to:
 Susan Lyon, Countess of Strathmore and Kinghorne, Scottish noble
 Susan Reeve Lyon, English apothecary

See also
 Sue Lyon, American actress
 Susan Lyons, Australian actress